Band or BAND may refer to:

Places
Bánd, a village in Hungary
Band, Iran, a village in Urmia County, West Azerbaijan Province, Iran
Band, Mureș, a commune in Romania
Band-e Majid Khan, a village in Bukan County, West Azerbaijan Province, Iran

People
Band (surname), various people with the surname

Arts, entertainment, and media

Music
Musical ensemble, a group of people who perform instrumental or vocal music
Band (rock and pop), a small ensemble that plays rock or pop
Concert band, an ensemble of woodwind, brass, and percussion instruments
Dansband, band playing popular music for a partner-dancing audience
Jazz band, a musical ensemble that plays jazz music
Marching band, a group of instrumental musicians who generally perform outdoors
School band, a group of student musicians who rehearse and perform instrumental music
The Band, a Canadian-American rock and roll group
The Band (album), The Band's eponymous 1969 album
"Bands" (song), by American rapper Comethazine
"The Band", a 2002 single by Mando Diao

Other uses in arts, entertainment and media
Band, nickname of Brazilian television network Rede Bandeirantes
The Band (film), a 1978 Israeli film
The Band (musical), a 2017 musical by Tim Firth with the music of Take That

Clothing, jewelry, and accessories
Armband or arm band
Smart band a band with electronic component
Microsoft Band, a smart band with smartwatch features from the software giant
Bandolier or bandoleer, an ammunition belt
Bands (neckwear), two pieces of cloth fitted around the neck as part of formal clothing for clergy, academics, and lawyers
Belt (clothing), a flexible band or strap, typically made of leather or heavy cloth, and worn around the waist
Strap, an elongated flap or ribbon, usually of fabric or leather
Wedding band, a metal ring indicating the wearer is married

Military
Bands (Italian Army irregulars), 19th- and 20th-century military units in the service of the Italian "Regio Esercito"
Female order of the Band, a medieval military order native to Spain
Order of the Band, a medieval military order native to Spain

Science and technology
Band (algebra), an idempotent semigroup
Band (order theory), a solid subset of an ordered vector space that contains its supremums
Band (radio), a range of frequencies or wavelengths in radio and radar, specifically:
Frequency band
LTE frequency bands used for cellphone data
Shortwave bands
UMTS frequency bands used for cellphones
BAND (software), a mobile app that facilitates group communication
Band cell, a type of white blood cell
Bird banding, placing a numbered metal band on a bird's leg for identification
Electronic band structure of electrons in solid-state physics
Gastric band, a human weight-control measure
Signaling (telecommunications):
In-band signaling
Out-of-band
Birds Are Not Dinosaurs, or BAND, a controversial stance on the origin of birds

Society and government
Band (First Nations Canada), the primary unit of First Nations Government in Canada
Band society, a small group of humans in a simple form of society
Tribe (Native American), a tribe, band, nation, or other group or community of Indigenous peoples in the United States

Other uses
Rubber band
The Band (professional wrestling), the Total Nonstop Wrestling name for the professional wrestling stable New World Order

See also

Band of Brothers (disambiguation)
Bandage
Banding (disambiguation)
Bandy (disambiguation)
Bend (disambiguation)
Drum and bugle corps (disambiguation)
Herd, a social grouping of certain animals of the same species
Ribbon (disambiguation)
Stripe (disambiguation)